The 1996–97 FR Yugoslavia Cup was the fifth season of the FR Yugoslavia's annual football cup. The cup defenders was Red Star Belgrade, and they were him successfully defended, after they defeated FK Vojvodina in the final.

First round

|}

Second round
The 16 winners from the prior round enter this round. The first legs were played on 9 October and the second legs were played on 23 October 1996.
 

|}
Note: Roman numerals in brackets denote the league tier the clubs participated in the 1996–97 season.

Quarter-finals
The eight winners from the prior round enter this round. The first legs were played on 13 November and the second legs were played on 26 and 27 November 1996.

|}
Note: Roman numerals in brackets denote the league tier the clubs participated in the 1996–97 season.

Semi-finals
The eight winners from the prior round enter this round. The first legs were played on 19 March and the second legs were played on 9 April 1997.

|}
Note: Roman numerals in brackets denote the league tier the clubs participated in the 1996–97 season.

Final

First leg

Second leg

Red Star won 1–0 on aggregate.

See also
 1996–97 First League of FR Yugoslavia
 1996–97 Second League of FR Yugoslavia

References

External links
Results on RSSSF

FR Yugoslavia Cup
Cup
Yugo